Mahathir Mohamad formed the third Mahathir cabinet after being invited by Tuanku Iskandar to begin a new government following the 3 August 1986 general election in Malaysia. Prior to the election, Mahathir led (as Prime Minister) the second Mahathir cabinet, a coalition government that consisted of members of the component parties of Barisan Nasional. It was the 11th cabinet of Malaysia formed since independence.

This is a list of the members of the third cabinet of the fourth Prime Minister of Malaysia, Mahathir Mohamad.

Composition

Full members
The federal cabinet consisted of the following ministers:

Deputy ministers

Composition before cabinet dissolution

Full members

Deputy ministers

See also
 Members of the Dewan Rakyat, 7th Malaysian Parliament
 List of parliamentary secretaries of Malaysia#Third Mahathir cabinet

References

Cabinet of Malaysia
1986 establishments in Malaysia
1990 disestablishments in Malaysia
Cabinets established in 1986
Cabinets disestablished in 1990